Agentive may refer to:
An agentive suffix
The agentive case
A grammatical agent